The Sony Xperia 1 is an Android smartphone manufactured and marketed by Sony. Part of Sony's flagship Xperia series, the device was announced to the public at a press conference held at the annual 2019 Mobile World Congress event on February 25, 2019. It is the world's first smartphone with an ultrawide 21:9 aspect ratio 4K HDR OLED display, dubbed Cinema Wide, and Sony's first triple-lens camera system featuring Eye AF eye-tracking technology seen in the company's Alpha line of professional-grade cameras. The Xperia 1 was later joined by a more compact variant, the Xperia 5, which was revealed on 5 September 2019. Compared to the Xperia 1, the Xperia 5 has a smaller 1080p screen, a smaller battery , and a non-centrally aligned camera module.

On 25 October 2019, a slightly revised version of the Sony Xperia 1 called the Sony Xperia 1 Professional Edition (J9150) was released exclusively in Japan, which is mainly sold SIM-unlocked and unlike the Japan-only carrier models, features a hybrid dual-SIM slot and has an internal storage capacity of  like the J8110, J8170 and J9110 models. The J9150 model however does not include support for 1seg mobile TV as well as Mobile Feli Ca and Osaifu-Keitai, unlike said carrier-only models.

This phone had not launched in India.

Hardware

Design and build
The Xperia 1 is designed around the new 21:9 aspect ratio display, a rework from the previous "Ambient Flow" design seen in the Xperia XZ3. It consists of a 7000-series aluminum alloy chassis that has a curved edge all around the device, a 2.5D scratch-resistant front and curved-edged back glass panels made of Corning Gorilla Glass 6, resulting in a more squarish but symmetrical design aesthetic, reminiscent of the classic "Omni Balance" design language of old Xperia Z-series flagships. The most defining change in the Xperia 1, as it was in the Xperia XZ2 trio and the XZ3, are the placement of the camera on the back. It is centrally aligned on the upper half of the device, as opposed to being placed on the top-left side like in previous Xperia devices. The NFC antenna is placed on the left-hahdnd side of the new triple-lens camera system, housed in a raised module with chrome beveled edges surrounding it, along with the color sensing (RGBC-IR sensor) and the single LED flash up top.

The front houses the  ultra-wide 4K HDR OLED display with slight curve corners and very minimal bezels on both sides, and aignificantly slim (when compared to the XZ3) but athethemetrical top and bottom bezels. On the top bezel is the earpiece that acts as part of the hybrid dual-stereo speaker setup, the 8 MP front-facing camera, ambient light and proximity sensor and a notification LED. The hybrid SIM tray is located on the top of the device, with a sealed pull-out type cover for added ingress protection. The bottom bezel has shrunk significantly and is blank, omitting the company logo entirely. The second part of the stereo speaker is relegated to the bottom along with the lone USB Type-C port and primary microphone.

The fingerprint sensor is now re-positioned back to the right-hand side of the device as with previous XZ Series devices, nd is now activated even in the US market. This is possible, in part because the power button is now separate. To mitigate this, scanner is now an always-on affair. Directly above the fingerprint scanner is the volume rocker, and below the power button near the bottom edge is the 2-stage camera shutter button, very rare in smartphones nowadays and a unique staple of Xperia devices ever since.

It is rated IP65/IP68 dust/water-proof up to 1.5 m for 30 minutes. The device comes in 4 colors: Black, White, Gray and in some markets, Purple.

Performance
The Xperia 1 is powered by the Qualcomm Snapdragon 855 chipset, built on a 7 nm process technology with 8 Kryo 485 processors in a 1 + 3 + 4 configuration (1x 2.84 GHz Gold Prime, 3x 2.42 GHz Gold, and 4x 1.8 GHz Silver), 6 GB of LPDDR4X RAM and an Adreno 640 for graphics rendering. It has the option a 64 GB (SO-03L, SOV4,0, and 802SO models) or 128 GB (J8110, J8170, J9110 and J9150 models) UFS 2.1 internal storage and comes in a single-SIM or hybrid dual-SIM versions depending on region, with both featuring 5CA LTE Cat.19 of up to 1.6 Gbit/s download speeds. It also has microSD card expansion of up to 512 GB in a hybrid SIM 2 slot setup.

Display
The Xperia 1 showcases the world's first  21:9 aspect ratio 4K HDR OLED display officially called CinemaWide, with a 3840 × 1644 resolution and 64 ppi pixel density. This aspect ratio was previously found in LG New Chocolate (BL40). In a more practical approach, the display resolution on regular usage and throughout the UI only is at PPI ppi, which is still considered sharp and is especially beneficial for the battery. The full 4K resolution only triggers automatically when compatible content is displayed on-screen.

The Xperia 1 also has a new system-wide color setting feature, called "Creator mode", alongside the "Standard" and "Super-vivid" modes. When activated, the Xperia 1 tries its best to display accurate colors as close as possible to the original intention of the content creator. It has a BT-2022 certification fhe HDR, which is more versatile than HDR10. The dispsupports the wide color space ITU-R BT.2020m andl as DCI P3 and Illuminant D65. It does however require the source to be encoded with the proper color info to take advantage of the feature. The device also has the new X1 for mobile engine borrowed from their BRAVIA TV line, optimizing content that is not natively-created for the high contrast and color palette of the OLED panel.

Camera

The Xperia 1 further improves and upgrades the previous Motion Eye camera from the XZ3 with a Sony-first Triple lens camera system. It is composed of the primary 12.2 MP 1/2.55" Exmor RS for mobile memory-stacked Dual Photo Diode (2PD) sensor with a 1.4 μm behind an f/1.6 aperture, 26 mm "regular wide" lens;  a second 12 MP 1/3.4" RGB sensor with a 1.0 μm behind an f/2.4 aperture, 52 mm lens and 2x optical zoom for "telephoto"; and a  third 12 MP 1/3.4" RGB sensor with a 1.0 μm sitting behind an f/2.4 aperture, 16 mm 130° "ultra-wide-angle" lens. They are paired with the RGBC-IR color spectrum sensor that assists the white balance of the camera by providing additional light data from the surrounding conditions of the scene, and a single LED flash. The front selfie camera has a 1/4" 8-megapixel sensor with an f/2.0 lens and SteadyShot with Intelligent Active Mode (5-axis stabilization).

The Xperia 1 is capable of capturing 4K HDR video, and the two sensors (primary and telephoto) are optically-stabilized, a first for an Xperia device, dubbed Optical SteadyShot. It has an Intelligent Active Mode where it which alongside the standard electronic SteadyShot (5-axis EIS + OIS) for better video stabilization. Exclusive for the Xperia 1 is the BIONZ X for mobile image-processing engine, borrowed from Sony's Alpha professional cameras. This brings pro camera Alpha technologies to the Xperia line for a more professional approach to mobile photography.

First and unique for the Xperia 1 is the new fast Eye AF.  It is an intelligent focusing system that focuses and locks into a subject's eye for an impressively-accurate subject tracking. It can accurately calculate and measure the distance of the subject it is currently tracking from the device, and, through machine learning, can also remember the particular person's eye if he/she was either blocked by view or moved out of the frame for a while and then back in.

An additional camera feature is Cinema Pro, which is a video capture application designed in collaboration with Sony's CineAlta division and squarely aimed at cinematography enthusiasts. Other unique camera features of the Xperia 1 include an Autofocus burst with up to 10 fps of AF/AE tracking, Predictive Hybrid Autofocus, an Anti-distortion shutter and RAW image file recording with RAW noise reduction.

The Xperia 1 also has Predictive Capture. When it detects fast-paced movement, the camera automatically captures a maximum of four photos before the shutter button is pressed, and lets the user select the best one afterwards. This is done without any user intervention and is possible due to the same built-in DRAM chip on the image sensor used in capturing the 960 fps super slow-motion videos.

Battery
The Xperia 1 is powered by a non-removable 3,330 mAh lithium-ion battery. Charging and data transfer is handled by a USB-C 3.1 port with support for USB Power Delivery. It also has Qnovo adaptive charging technology built-in which allows the device to monitor the cell's electrochemical processes in real time and adjust charging parameters accordingly to minimize cell damage and extend the battery unit's lifespan.

Battery Care
The Xperia 1 also comes with Battery Care, Sony's proprietary charging algorithm that controls the charging process of the phone through machine learning. It recognizes the user's charging habits for a certain period and automatically adjusts itself to the pattern, for example an overnight charge, by stopping the initial charging to about 80–90 percent, and then continuing it until full from where it left off the next day. This effectively prevents the unnecessary damage to the battery's cells from excessive heat and current due to overcharging, further increasing the battery's life span.

Audio and connectivity
The Xperia 1, like the Xperia XZ2 that started it, has the standard 3.5 mm audio jack omitted in favor of wireless. To make up for the removal, it has improved wireless audio connectivity along with LDAC, an audio coding technology developed in-house by Sony which is now a part of the Android Open Source Project, that enables the transmission of 24-bit/96 kHz High-Resolution (Hi-Res) audio content over Bluetooth at up to 990 kbit/s, three times faster than conventional audio streaming codecs, to compatible audio devices. It also comes with Dolby Atmos for a better sound reproduction.

Other connectivity options include Bluetooth 5 with aptX HD and Low Energy, NFC, 4x4 MIMO antennas for fast WI-Fi and cellular upload/download speeds, dual-band Wi-Fi a/b/g/n/ac, Wi-Fi Direct, DLNA, GPS (with A-GPS), GLONASS, BeiDou and Galileo satellite positioning. The Xperia 1, like most high-end smartphone nowadays, has no FM radio.

Software
The Sony Xperia 1 is launched with the Android 9.0 "Pie" operating system, along with Smart Stamina battery saving modes and Sony's proprietary multimedia apps. It features an improved Side Sense. It works through a pair of touch-sensitive areas on either side of the phone. A tap or slide triggers various actions set by the user, most of which configurable including the sensitivity of the touch areas. Another feature by the Side Sense is Pair shortcut which, upon launch from the Side Sense window, will trigger a split-screen setup with the selected pair of user-customizable apps instantly.
In December 2019, Sony began to release Android 10 for the Xperia 1.

References

Further reading 
 
 

Android (operating system) devices
Flagship smartphones
Sony smartphones
Mobile phones introduced in 2019
Mobile phones with multiple rear cameras
Mobile phones with 4K video recording